Prince Chun of the First Rank, or simply Prince Chun, was the title of a princely peerage used in China during the Manchu-led Qing dynasty (1644–1912). As the Prince Chun peerage was not awarded "iron-cap" status, this meant that each successive bearer of the title would normally start off with a title downgraded by one rank vis-à-vis that held by his predecessor. However, the title would generally not be downgraded to any lower than a feng'en fuguo gong except under special circumstances.

The first bearer of the title was Lunghi (1660–1679), the Shunzhi Emperor's seventh son. In 1674, Lunghi was granted the title "Prince Chun of the First Rank" by his third brother, the Kangxi Emperor. After Lunghi's death, the title was passed on to his infant son, Fu'erhulun (1679–1681), who died prematurely. The peerage thus ended with Fu'erhulun's death.

Members of the Prince Chun peerage
 Lunghi (隆禧; 1660–1679), the Shunzhi Emperor's seventh son, held the title Prince Chun of the First Rank from 1674 to 1679, posthumously honoured as Prince Chunjing of the First Rank (純靖親王)
 Fu'erhulun (富爾祜倫; 1679–1681), Lunghi's son, held the title Prince Chun of the First Rank from 1679 to 1681, died prematurely and had no heir

See also
 Royal and noble ranks of the Qing dynasty

References
 

Qing dynasty princely peerages
1674 establishments in China
Peerages of the Bordered White Banner
Extinct Qing dynasty princely peerages